M.I.C.R.A.: Mind Controlled Remote Automaton (often referred to as simply MICRA or Micra) is an unfinished creator-owned American science fiction comic book series written by Lamar Waldron and drawn by Ted Boonthanakit. It was published between November 1986 and Spring 1988 by Fictioneer Books, an imprint of Comics Interview publisher David Anthony Kraft. Set in 2048–49, the story concerns a young paraplegic college student who is able to take control of the titular robotic body via telepresence.

Creation
Waldron conceived of the storyline some four years before publication. He had hoped to again partner with Rod Whigham after their well-received collaboration on the graphic novel Lightrunner, but after the artist found work with Marvel Comics Waldron instead planned it as a prose novel. However, he went back to the original plan, intending to work with airbrush artist Tom Gonzales. The pair were unable to find a publisher until WaRP Graphics showed an interest, and then only as a black-and-white series. As Gonzales had no experience in the medium he left the project. Waldron found a new artist via a competition at the Atlanta Fantasy Fair, an event he co-founded, which unearthed the Thailand-born Ted Boonthanakit.

The author aimed to combine aspects of the superhero, science fiction and robot comics in M.I.C.R.A.. Waldron felt telepresence was an achievable near-future technology, and also hoped to address his views on the planet's ecological future, telling Amazing Heroes "The trends are there – all I've done is assume they continue to accelerate at the same rate". He hoped that as well as exploring these concepts the work would still be able to present strong characters.

Publishing history
M.I.C.R.A was planned as a 12-issue limited series.
Before any material was published the series encountered problems with WaRP the comic hit problems; Waldron instead pitched it to Kraft, who was looking to expand his portfolio after the success of Southern Knights, and a deal was struck. The first issue was released in September 1986 (cover-dated November 1986), and was heavily advertised by Kraft with inserts in Comics Buyer's Guide, which would also run several pieces promoting the series. Kraft would state the tactics led to considerable demand for the first issue. Further support came when M.I.C.R.A was featured on the cover of Kraft's Comics Interview No. 49, which included a lengthy interviews with Waldron, Boonthanakit and series letterer Susan Barrows.

Initially the comic was bi-monthly but changed to quarterly from No. 3. Issue No. 7 featured a recap, with advertising flagging it as a good starting point for new readers and linking the story matter with the successful film Robocop. The comic reputedly had a circulation of 30,000, outselling acclaimed titles of the period such as Love and Rockets, "Omaha" the Cat Dancer and Xenozoic Tales, but was a victim of a glut of small publisher black-and-white comics on the market. Feeling Kraft was unable to support the title in the competitive market, Waldron did not renew the contact with Fictioneer following the publication of No. 7.

Waldron looked for another publisher to continue it, possibly as a colour title. Apple Comics were announced as M.I.C.R.A'''s new publisher in 1988 with issue No. 8, "All Hell Breaks Loose" announced and a trade paperback containing the stories to date also planned for 1989. Apple also planned to continue the series further after the initial 12-issue storyline was completed. However, no further issues were produced before Apple folded in 1994.

Synopsis
In 2048, much of Earth's atmosphere has become polluted, and America is controlled by the authoritarian President Corman, who effectively has the country under martial law. The privileged Insiders live in A.S.Ds – Air Supported Domes – where it is pure, while the poor live beyond as Outsiders, many of whom die early from cancer. Spoilt rich girl Angela Griffin is a bioengineering student at King University in the South Dakota A.S.D. but is uninterested in the M.I.C.R.A. (Mind Controlled Remote Automaton) system devised by lecturer Doctor Aleta Lucane, being more focused on a visit to Yellowstone Recreation Dome with her boyfriend Matt. However, the dome comes under attack by rebel Free America Now forces; Angela is grievously injured and abandoned by Matt. She is left comatose and paraplegic; her distraught, rich adoptive father dies in a Speeder crash shortly after visiting her. Unknown to Angela, her biological sister Rita Morales is among the Outsiders, and a violent member of Free America Now. On Christmas Day, Angela regains consciousness, but her bratty attitude irritates the King University Hospital staff, including her nurse Tanya. Over the next couple of months she gradually comes to regret her attitude, and is visited by classmate Eric Jensen, who arranges for Lucane to meet with her. The professor is sympathetic towards Angela's plight and offers the hope of a human application for the M.I.C.R.A. technology if she resumes her studies. Simultaneously, wanting to avoid the scrutiny of principled Vice President Paula Robinson while exploring the military potential of M.I.C.R.A., Corman and General Wyler underwrite Lucane's research budget, with Colonel Barr assigned as observer. After a few weeks, the M.I.C.R.A. synthetic android is ready, and Angela is able to successfully mentally transfer to the robot, though her initial control is clumsy.

Nevertheless, Barr considers the first test a success, and Angela continues to become more reasonable, bonding with Eric and nurse Tanya. M.I.C.R.A. undergoes flight testing soon afterwards, while Angela learns she was adopted. Meanwhile, Rita and Free America Now seize control of the Dallas A.S.D, and government commandos are sent in to reclaim it, with both sides causing collateral damage. Most of Rita's followers are killed but she is able to escape on a Speeder. Wounded, she crashes and her Speeder's distress signal is picked up by M.I.C.R.A.; however, when Angela sends the robot to investigate it comes under fire. M.I.C.R.A. attacks the rebels and identifies Rita as the leader, only to be disabled by a high-powered electrical blast. Angelia is able to reboot M.I.C.R.A. and confronts Rita, discovering she is her biological sister, and they were both born Outsiders. Discovering M.I.C.R.A. has automatic weaponry built in, she disables the Free America Now soldiers, though Rita escapes. M.I.C.R.A.'s first mission is declared a success. The unit is then sent to the Detroit A.S.D. to meet an army informant; however, the spy has defected to Free America Now and M.I.C.R.A. is trapped. Army reinforcements arrive in time to prevent the destruction of M.I.C.R.A., who is filmed by a news crew. Enraged over the military's interference in the project, Locane declares that M.I.C.R.A. will be shut down.

Angela's attorney meanwhile has located her birth mother Maria Morales. Barr is able to persuade Locane to continue the M.I.C.R.A. project, with the compromise that Angela will have manual control of the weapons systems.  They conspire to use M.I.C.R.A. to visit the San Simeon slum looking for her mother. However, she discovers Maria has been dead some time, killed in a riot shortly after her adoption, with another resident drawing her social security checks. With the help of the resident she learns Rita has been working at the Monterey ASD in an Esctasite, a high-tech brothel. M.I.C.R.A. travels there but her enquiries are fruitless as Rita is at a Free America Now rally in Lusk, Wyoming, announcing on TV that the whole settlement is being held hostage. With the regular army unable to make any impression on Rita's forces, M.I.C.R.A. is sent to Wyoming, bargaining for better treatment of Eric in return. However Rita is able to use an electrical generator to knock M.I.C.R.A. off-line. Angela is able to reboot the robot and get to Rita. She attempts to convince her sister of her identity but before she can Rita is seemingly killed by army reinforcements. Angela is enraged, especially when the army begins massacring surrendering rebels, shooting down one of the government speeders. Upon M.I.C.R.A.'s return to Kings University, a distraught Angela tells Barr she no longer wants to be part of the programme. He attempts to talk her out of it, revealing he is secretly aligned with Robinson, who contacts Angela and asks her to continue as M.I.C.R.A. Angela tells Barr of her relation to Rita and her actions in Wyoming, and with the support of Locane and Eric they conspire to use M.I.C.R.A. to covertly curb the military's excesses while Robinson works to end martial law through legitimate political means. The Free America Now survivors are now led by Rita's friend Flik and reach the Colorado dome, and M.I.C.R.A. is sent in to help the mopping up operation. The terrorists are captured – as are numerous councillors loyal to Robinson, as part of Corman's plan to equate her hopes of ending martial law with the terrorist group. The president is also eager to mass-produce M.I.C.R.A. for the armed forces. Angela uses M.I.C.R.A. to free the councillors held in Colorado without discovery, and begins a relationship with Eric while Lucane and Barr also grow closer.

However, military intelligence has learned of Angela's origin as an Outsider, and that she is sister to Rita. In the Washington dome, Wyler and his adjutant Evans soon begin to realise that Angela and her friends are actually helping the rebels during an action at Cheyenne. Wyler orders them killed before he is disgraced, and contacts Angela offering her radical surgery that will end her paralysis. However, the tactile feedback from a feeling body would mean the end of her time as M.I.C.R.A. However, the surgery is a ruse by Wyler to lull the group into a sense of security; he kidnaps Flik and fellow rebel Woryer, planning to use them as stooges for the murders of Locane and Eric, while arranging for the hospital's power supply to go off during Angela's operation. However Tanya, a mole for military intelligence, tearfully confesses the plan to Angela. She protests as the operations begins, and the surgeon tells her she has to decide whether she wants the treatment or not. Meanwhile, Barr is shot by Wyler after attempting to break free, and the general waits for the powercut that will signify Angela's death.

Unpublished material
The series went out of publication before the storyline could be resolved, ending on a cliffhanger. Waldron suggested that M.I.C.R.A. No. 8 would see someone else take control of M.I.C.R.A., and that the main cast fight their way out of the dome and winter with the Outsiders in North Dakota. The third arc from #9–12 would have been set several months later. Reputedly Waldron was frequently asked about the resolution of the cliffhanger at conventions in the following years. A text story featuring M.I.C.R.A. originally written for a fanzine by Waldron was printed in issue 12 of Caliber Press' anthology Negative Burn in 1994, and the character was featured on the cover using new art created by Boonthanakit. In an accompanying interview, Waldron was still optimistic about Apple Comics publishing new material for the series.  the work remains incomplete.

Additional material
Timelines of the series' "future history" written by Waldron were printed in M.I.C.R.A. No. 2, No. 4 and No. 6 Boonthanakit also produced a pin-up of M.I.C.R.A. for Amazing Heroes' 1987 Swimsuit issue.

Reception
Don Thompson graded the first issue 'A' in a review for Comic Buyer's Guide, calling it "one heck of a good comic book" and praising Boonthanakit's art. R.A. Jones of Amazing Heroes was also positive, noting it "combined the genres of superheroes and science fiction with overtones of Japanimation to yield a comic that's truly unique", also complementing the art. 
The cover of the second issue carried praise from Stan Lee and Ray Bradbury, while the collected edition also bore testimonials from Roger Zelazny, Trina Robbins, Will Eisner, Thompson and Robert Bloch.

Joe Pruett would later describe M.I.C.R.A. as the first comic to deal with virtual reality and one of the first with a "realistic ecological theme". In a retrospective review for Atomic Junk Shop, Fraser Sherman was positive about the series, noting it "was good stuff, but not successful stuff". D. Aviva Rothschild also felt the lack of completion was frustrating, calling M.I.C.R.A. "first-rate science fiction" when covering Graphic Album No. 1 for reference book Graphic Novels''.

Collected Editions
An album containing the first three issues, a foreword by Waldron and early sketches by Boonthanakit was released by Fictioneer in 1988. , issues #4-7 have not been collected.

References

External links

1986 comics debuts
1988 comics endings
American comics
Comic book limited series
Comics publications
Comics set in California
Comics set in Montana
Dystopian comics
Science fiction comics
Superhero comics
Telepresence in fiction
Unfinished comics